Buncom (also spelled Bunkum or Buncombe) is an abandoned mining town at the confluence of the Little Applegate River and Sterling Creek in Jackson County, Oregon, United States.
The site is promoted by the local historical society as a ghost town.

History
Buncom was first settled by Chinese miners in 1851 when gold was discovered in nearby Sterling Creek and Jacksonville.
Minerals such as cinnabar, chromite, and silver were also mined. A general store was built, and in 1861 J. T. Williams opened a saloon. The Buncom Mining District was created in 1867. Buncom post office was established in 1896. By 1918, the gold in the area was depleted, the post office was closed, and the town was abandoned. Most of the buildings were later burned down.

Only three buildings from the early 1900s remain: the post office (built in 1910), the cookhouse, and the bunkhouse.
In 1991, the Buncom Historical Society was created. The society replaced all three of the roofs of the buildings in Buncom. The society has also restored the porch of the post office and the eaves of the cookhouse.

Climate
This region experiences warm (but not hot) and dry summers, with no average monthly temperatures above . According to the Köppen Climate Classification system, Buncom has a warm-summer Mediterranean climate, abbreviated "Csb" on climate maps.

See also
List of ghost towns in Oregon

References

External links

Photo of Buncom's Post Office by Wes Dickinson
Buncom, Oregon - Southern Oregon's Hidden Ghost Town

Populated places established in 1851
Ghost towns in Oregon
Unincorporated communities in Jackson County, Oregon
1851 establishments in Oregon Territory
Unincorporated communities in Oregon